Azcona is a Basque surname and the Castilianized form of Azkona. Notable people with the surname include:
Abel Azcona (born 1988), Spanish artist
Edison Azcona (born 2003), Dominican-American footballer
Elizabeth Azcona Bocock (born 1969), Honduran politician
Elizabeth Azcona Cranwell (1933–2004), Argentine poet
José Azcona Bocock (born 1972), Honduran businessman and politician
José Azcona del Hoyo (1927–2005), president of Honduras from 1986 to 1990
Marcelo López de Azcona (died 1653), Spanish Catholic prelate
Melchor de Mediavilla y Azcona, the acting governor of Texas between 1727 and 1731
Mikel Azcona (born 1996), Spanish auto racing driver
Librado Azcona (born 1984), Paraguayan footballer
Rafael Azcona (1926–2008), Spanish screenwriter and novelist

See also
Estadio Olímpico José Simón Azcona, a stadium located in Tegucigalpa, Honduras

Basque-language surnames